Ithel Hael or Ithel Hael o Lydaw was a prince of Armorica who lived in the early part of the sixth century. He was the father of Baglan, Flewyn, Gredifael, Tanwg, Twrog, Tegai, Trillo, Tecwyn and Llechid, saints who accompanied Cadfan to Britain.

References

Companions of Cadfan
Kings of Brittany
Place of birth unknown
Year of birth unknown
Year of death unknown
Armorica